An Sgùrr is a hill in Scotland, occupying the broad peninsula between Loch Carron and Loch Kishorn. It has the appearance of a rough knoll, with small crags ringing the summit, particularly on the western side.

The hill may be climbed from a number of locations. The A896 road passes some two kilometres to the north, whilst a forestry track from south of Lochcarron allows access to the southeast. The path between Achintraid and Reraig passes to the south west side of An Sgùrr; the summit may be reached from Bealach that separates An Sgùrr from Bad a' Chreamha, which lies a kilometre or so east of this path.

Marilyns of Scotland
Mountains and hills of the Northwest Highlands